The 1967 All-Ireland Senior Camogie Championship Final was the 36th All-Ireland Final and the deciding match of the 1967 All-Ireland Senior Camogie Championship, an inter-county camogie tournament for the top teams in Ireland.

Dublin made a stronger start and let at half-time by a goal, but Antrim fought back for a draw. Mairéad McAtamney scored three goals for the Glenswomen.

In the replay, Antrim ended 10 years of Dublin dominance with a four-point win. This match marked the end of an era: having won 18 of the previous 19 titles, Dublin did not win again for 18 years.

References

All-Ireland Senior Camogie Championship Finals
Camogie
All-Ireland Senior Camogie Championship Final
All-Ireland Senior Camogie Championship Final
All-Ireland Senior Camogie Championship Final
All-Ireland Senior Camogie Championship Final, 1967